Maria Ilieva is a Bulgarian singer, songwriter and producer. She is  recognized  as  one of the  most  successful  female vocal artists of the contemporary Bulgarian music scene. In the last over 20 years of active solo career, she has released over 30 hit singles, two award winning studio albums, a maxi single and a greatest hits album. She has received over 40 awards for music and style.

Alongside her music career, Ilieva was a judge on the first, second and third seasons of X factor (Bulgaria) and part of the judging panel of The Masked Singer (Bulgarian TV series) season 1. In 2019 she finished second in the 8th season of the Bulgairan version of Your Face Sounds Familiar. She has appeared in a number of Bulgarian and international films and TV series. 

Maria has taken part in a vast number of social and philanthropy activities supporting regional and national causes.

Early life
Maria Ilieva was born in Veliko Tarnovo, Bulgaria, in a family of musicians. Her mother, Vanya Moneva, is the choir-master of the Vanya Moneva female choir and her late father, Krasimir Iliev, was the conductor of Sofia Wind Orchestra. Trained pianist since the age of five, she developed her vocal skills as a member of the “Petko Stainov” Choir Academy.

Ilieva graduated from the Sofia High School of Mathematics. She proceeded to receive a master's degree in Insurance and a master's degree in International Relations.
Her career as a performing vocal artist started in the late 1990 as the lead vocalist of the bands Visoko and Kaffe Band – the latter best known abroad for representing Bulgaria at the 2005 Eurovision Song Contest.

Music career

Moon Dream (2001 single & album)
The launch of Maria Ilieva's solo career is marked by the release of her first single "Moon Dream" in the summer of 2001. The album (also titled Moon Dream) was duly released later on in the year, having been described by a Bulgarian website as a phenomenon in BG pop music.
Singles released from the album ("Moon Dream", "Nothing") have gone straight to No.1 in all leading Bulgarian radio and television pop charts, while "Alright" (produced in collaboration with the avant-garde soul-funk band TE), shot to fame by staying on the top of Bulgarian Top 100 chart for an unprecedented 13 successive weeks.

Stereo Room (2002 maxi single)
Ilieva's next project, Stereo Room, included remixes by Bulgarian DJs. The single "Stereo room" was the first completely animated Bulgarian music video produced.

I Come To You (2007 album)
After establishing her own record label "MI Productions" in 2003, Maria Ilieva worked in collaboration with Bulgarian and American musicians, songwriters and producers to record her album I Come To You, including the singles:

 "What Does It Take" – first single released in English /video produced in Los Angeles, USA/, went straight to No.1 as a new entry on MM TV’s TOP 20;
 "Idvash kam men" (You come to me) – Ilieva's first ballad single;
 "Kradena Lubov" (Born for love) – duet single with Bulgarian male vocalist/composer Graffa, whose video went to No.6 on MTV Europe’s World Chart Express;
 "Off the Record" – Ilieva's first collaboration with a hip-hop artist – Knas /Knas&Bacardi/ – 3 weeks at No.1 – Out of 5 chart of Bulgarian national television;
 "Minalo" (Past) – a single that has gone to No.1 on "BG Radio's TOP 20" chart and stayed there for 5 weeks;
 "On My Own" – a single dedicated to the fight against human trafficking and forced prostitution. Official world premiere – 24 March 2007, at The stars of Europe concert, dedicated to the 50th anniversary of EU, broadcast on 56 national TV stations worldwide;
 "Dumi" (Words) – went straight to No.1 on MM TV's TOP 20 three weeks after its release. Premiered on MTV Europe on 24.11.07.

Truly (2009 single) 
“Truly", the pilot single from Maria's upcoming album, is a vocal house duet song with the American DJ/songwriter/producer Keith Thompson, best known for his remarkable collaboration "Break 4 Love" with David Vendetta. The Bassmonkeys’ remix of "Truly" topped BG Radio's weekly Top 20 chart and remained at No1 for six consecutive weeks, a precedent in the chart's history, and won the Best Duet Award at the ceremony in 2010. "Truly" also won the Best SEE Pop Song at the SEEME Awards in 2010. A phenomenal success for the single was its reaching the top position at the number 1 Australian dance radio station ZFM's chart. It was also rotated on the most popular online Argentinean radio station SonicFM.

I Like (2010 single) 
“I Like", Maria's following hit single, reached the No. 1 positions in all the national music charts. It stayed at No. 1 at Eurochannel's Prime Time Top 10 chart for three consecutive months.

O Primeiro Grande Amor – a duet with Tony Carreira 
In 2012 at the Top of the Top festival in Poland Maria Ilieva met Tony Carreira, a multi platinum Portuguese singer-songwriter who later invited her to record a duet for his upcoming album "Essencial" orchestrated by the London Symphonic Orchestra. "O Primeiro Grande Amor" (The first big love) is recorded in studio Guillaume Tell in Paris, and the album became four times platinum within three months of its release.

2013 singles – "Wanna Be The Best", "Igraya stilno", "Uslovie #1" 
In 2013 Maria released three singles, two in collaboration and one solo. "Wanna Be The Best" by KNAS and the Swedish hip-hop artist Bacardy featuring Maria Ilieva took over the clubs in Bulgaria and quickly turns into a summer hit. "Igraya stilno", Maria's long anticipated solo single carries the singer's unique vibe and style. A remix by the Bulgarian musician/composer Dexter turned into a massive club hit. Maria's next project, the reggae hit "Uslovie #1" (Rule #1) took Maria's fans to a whole new experience. The song is a duet with Zafayah, part of the best Eastern European reggae band Roots Rocket.

"Vidimo dovolni" – a duet with Krisko 
In 2014 Maria records a duet with the hip-hop artist / beatmaker in the country – Krisko. Their song "Vidimo dovolni" was the most rotated song for 2014 and one of the biggest Bulgarian internet hit of all times back in the days with over 35 million views on YouTube (as of July 2022).

"Neka Vali" (2016 single) 
One of Maria's most distinguished ballads cowritten by her.

"Vsichko" & "Ne si gotov (Vsichko p. 2)" (2018 singles) 
Both songs cowritten by Maria, and the latter features the hottest Bulgarian trap musicians V:RGO & TRF.

"Vsichko - nay-dobroto ot Maria Ilieva" (2018 Greatest hits album) 
Maria's first Greatest hits album features 16 original tracks and four remixes, including 11 unreleased hit singles. It is referred to as the "music gem".

"Fuego" & "Contigo" / "Tvoya" (2019 & 2020 singles) 
Maria's music style got a twist into the dancehall / latin genres with the two songs she released in Spanish one of which got a Bulgarian language version as well. Both were written by the Romanian producers Global Records.

"Ostani Tazi Nosht" (2021 single) 
Maria starred in and performed the OST of a Bulgarian TV show Portalat (The Portal, 2021 Miramar Films / BNT). "Ostani Tazi Nosht" is written by renowned Bulgarian authors Rafi Zhamakortsyan and Damyan Damyanov.

"Lubov" (2022 single) 
The first song entirely written by Maria Ilieva herself. The power ballad is often considered a peak in Maria's career so far.

Stereo Room – the record label
In 2007 Maria Ilieva founded her new label to promote young Bulgarian talent called "Stereo Room". This record label aims at producing and promoting young talented singers from Bulgaria. Special auditions took place in the beginning of 2008 and the first artist – Krista – was selected. Her debut single, "Tova, koeto iskash", went straight to No. 1 at all the national music charts and reached No. 2 on MTV Europe’s World Chart Express. The second artist produced by Stereo Room is B.O.Y.A.N. and his first single's ("It's Over") video premiere is on MAD TV on 9 February 2009. Other of the label's signed artists include "Imam", "Za teb", "Silna lyubov" (feat. Spens) and "Incomplete" – Krista; "Pop Trash", "Teen Life" – MONA; "Komplimenti" – KNAS feat. B.O.Y.A.N. 

==

Discography

Concerts
Billed as a top star at all established regional music festivals, Maria has performed alongside such greats as Glenn Hughes (Deep Purple), Simply Red, the Scorpions, Lou Bega, Zucchero, Gipsy Kings, James Arthur, Tony Carreira and others, and has been opening for artists such as George Michael, Simple Minds, Dannii Minogue, Atomic Kitten, Garaj Mahal.

Maria is a headliner at some of the most prestigious music festivals in South-East Europe, such as Apolonia, Bansko Jazz Fest, Music Jam, etc. and has had a number of concert and gig tours across Bulgaria, Austria, Germany, Belgium, Serbia, Romania, Macedonia, UK, USA.

In 2007 she was invited to represent Bulgaria as the only Eastern European artist in the Stars of Europe concert commemorating the 50th anniversary of the European Union in Brussels. The event was broadcast to nearly half a billion viewers all over the world.

Since 2008 Maria has toured the country with symphonic orchestras. This unique collaboration was perceived extremely well among the audience and media.

In 2011 Maria commemorated 10 years since the beginning of her solo career with a national tour. The final concert in Sofia took place on the largest scene ever built in Bulgaria for a Bulgarian music artist and was labelled a performance of highest class.

In August 2012 she was invited to represent Bulgaria at the Top of The Top Festival in Sopot, Poland, which brought together the biggest stars of 16 European countries.

In 2013 Maria is a special guest of Tony Carreira’s world tour during his three concerts in the legendary Olympia hall in Paris and two concerts in MEO Arena in Lisbon, Portugal.

In March 2015 Maria performed at the most technologically advanced hall on the Balkans – Sofia Event Center. The concert was highly praised by fans and critics.

A national tour "Vsichko - nay-dobroto ot Maria Ilieva" supporting the Greatest hits album took place in 2019 and visited the summer theaters in Plovdiv, Burgas & Varna, and finished in Hall 1 of the National Palace of Culture in Sofia.

Awards
Maria Ilieva has been awarded the Woman of the Year award by GRAZIA magazine Bulgaria in 2006, 2009, 2011, 2013, and 2018, and has been ranked as the most influential female celebrity by FORBES magazine Bulgaria for 2013, 2014 and 2015. 

Her music and style awards include:

2022

 Best Female Artist - BG Radio Music Awards

2019

 Best Female Artist - BG Radio Music Awards
 Woman of the Decade - Woman.bg

2018

 Woman of the Year - Grazia Magazine Awards

2016

 Best collaboration – "Taka da e" (with Atanas Kolev) – 359 Hip-Hop Awards

2015

 Best song – "Vidimo dovolni" (with Krisko) – BG Radio Music Awards
 Best song – “Vidimo dovolni” (with Krisko) – 359 Hip-Hop Awards
 Best collaboration – “Vidimo dovolni” (with Krisko) – 359 Hip-Hop Awards
 Most rotated song on The Voice TV channel – “Vidimo dovolni” (with Krisko) – a special award from The Voice TV, 359 Hip-Hop Awards
 Most liked, commented and shared video on Vbox7 – “Vidimo dovolni” (with Krisko) – a special award from Vbox7, 359 Hip-Hop Awards

2014

 Best Lyrics (Igraya Stilno) - BG Radio Music Awards

2013

 Most Stylish Woman – Grazia Magazine Awards

2008

 Best Female Artist – MM TV Music Awards
 Most Stylish Woman Award – Bravo FM Group

2007

 Best Album ("I Come To You"/M.I.Productions) – MM TV Awards
 Most Stylish Singer as announced by Elle Magazine
 Golden Pen Award – for a Special Contribution to Bulgarian Culture – Classic FM Radio/MAKTA

2006

 Best Female Artist – BG Radio Music Awards
 Woman of the Year – Grazia Magazine/Avon Awards

2005

 Best Female Artist Award – BG Radio Music Awards
 Best Style Award – Bravo FM Group

2004

 Best Female Artist – Melo TV Mania, BNT
 Best website of the year – International Media Festival Albena
 Best Hairstyle – Pantene Beauty Awards

2002–2003

 Best Female Artist – BG Radio Music Awards
 Best Female Artist – MM TV Awards
 Best Female Artist – Rhythm Magazine Awards
 Best Video Award (Nishto) – Rhythm Magazine Awards Най-добра изпълнителка – BG Radio Music Awards

2001–2002

 Best Debut – Melo TV Mania, Bulgarian National Television
 est Debut – MM TV Awards
 Best Video (Moon Dream) – BG Radio Music Awards
 Best Video (Moon Dream) – Forte Top 100 Awards, Bulgarian National Television
 Best Female Artist – BG Radio Music Awards
 Best Female Artist – Forte Top 100, Bulgarian National Television

Filmography

Social engagements
Apart from her music career, Maria Ilieva has been dedicated to a number of important social engagements and causes, such as:

 2018 – present – Official Spokesperson and Goodwill Ambassador for UNICEF’s campaign “For every child, #EarlyMomentsMatter”
 2018 – Goodwill ambassador for JAMBA’s campaign “Equality means more” aiming to integrate the persons with disabilities into the society
 2018 – present – Official Spokesperson for the National Cause Movement’s campaign “Do it for Bulgaria” aiming at increasing the country’s birth-rate
 2012 – present – Official Spokesperson for Teach For Bulgaria foundation facilitating equal access to education for every Bulgarian child
 2009 – present – Member of the Managing Board of the Bulgarian Organization for collective management of neighbouring music rights PROPHON 
 2008 – present – Spokesperson for ICanToo foundation's campaign to help us raising funds for the needs of children with disabilities
 2007 – Ambassador of the European Year of Equal Opportunities for All
 2006 – 2007 – Official Spokesperson for Face to Face Foundation's Campaign Against Human Trafficking and Forced Prostitution
 2006 – Official Spokesperson for Standard daily newspaper Fund-raiser Initiative for Talented Children
 2005 – present – Official Spokesperson for the Avon Cosmetics’ Campaign Against Breast Cancer, a part of the global initiative for breast cancer awareness and prevention

Brand ambassador / spokesperson
• 2013 – 2014 – Official Mtel Brand Ambassador and celebrity spokesperson

• 2013 – Official Avon Sensuelle Brand Ambassador and celebrity spokesperson

• 2009 – 2010 – Official KitKat Senses Brand Ambassador and celebrity spokesperson

• 2008 – 2009 – Official Société Générale Expressbank Brand Ambassador and celebrity spokesperson

• 2006 – 2007 – Official spokesperson for BMW

• 2005 – 2007 – Official celebrity spokesperson for Haute Couture designer NEVENA

• 2003 – 2005 – Official Pantene Pro-V Brand Ambassador and celebrity Spokesperson

References

External links
 Official Facebook profile
 Maria Ilieva on YouTube
 Maria Ilieva on Instagram
 
 Stereo Room official website

Living people
People from Veliko Tarnovo
21st-century Bulgarian women singers
1977 births
X Factor (Bulgarian TV series)
University of National and World Economy alumni